Bad Influence may refer to:

Film and television
 Bad Influence (film), a 1990 American film by Curtis Hanson
 Bad Influence!, a 1992–1996 British children's TV series covering computers and video games
 "Bad Influence" (21 Jump Street), a 1987 episode
 "Bad Influence" (The Weird Al Show), a 1997 episode

Music

Albums
 Bad Influence (Robert Cray album) or the title song, 1983
 The Bad Influence, by Lil Wyte, 2009
 Bad Influence, by La Chat, 2006
 Bad Influence, by YoungBloodZ, unreleased (2008)

Songs
 "Bad Influence" (song), by Pink, 2009
 "Bad Influence", by the B-52s from Good Stuff, 1992
 "Bad Influence", by Clutchy Hopkins and Shawn Lee from Clutch of the Tiger, 2008
 "Bad Influence", by Eminem from the End of Days film soundtrack, 1999
 "Bad Influence", by Omah Lay, 2020

Other uses
 Bad Influence (professional wrestling), a tag team consisting of Christopher Daniels and Frankie Kazarian
 Bad Influence, a 2004 novel by William Sutcliffe

See also
 Influence (disambiguation)